Franz Vogel (1883–1956) was a German film producer. In 1912 he established Eiko Film which enjoyed success during the First World War. In 1913 the company constructed the Marienfelde Studios in Berlin.

Selected filmography
 His Coquettish Wife (1916)
 The Unmarried Woman (1917)
 The Bracelet (1918)
 Love (1919)
 The Girl and the Men (1919)
 Battle of the Sexes (1920)
 Wibbel the Tailor (1920)
 Hate (1920)
 Sons of the Night (1921)
 The Testament of Joe Sivers (1922)
 The Iron Bride (1925)
 The Catwalk (1927)
 The Two Seals (1934)
 His Late Excellency (1935)
 The Accusing Song (1936)
 The Gambler (1938)
 Sergeant Berry (1938)
 A Man Astray (1940)
 The Black Robe (1944)
 Search for Majora (1949)
 Madonna in Chains (1949)
 Wedding with Erika (1950)

References

Bibliography
 Hans-Michael Bock and Tim Bergfelder. The Concise Cinegraph: An Encyclopedia of German Cinema. Berghahn Books.

External links

1883 births
1956 deaths
German film producers
Film people from Berlin